William Eric Viking Hahne (born 19 April 1992) is a Swedish politician who was the Deputy Chairman of the party Alternative for Sweden. He was Deputy Chairman of the Sweden Democratic Youth from September 2011 to September 2015. From November 2014 to April 2015 Hahne represented the Sweden Democrats in the City Council of Stockholm Municipality.

Hahne was expelled from the Sweden Democrats on 7 April 2015. Only hours after having left as deputy chairperson of the Sweden Democratic Youth, the Sweden Democrats announced that they break the ties between the party and the youth league to form a new youth league.

At the launching of the party Alternative for Sweden in March 2018 Hahne was presented as its Deputy Chairman. In March 2020 he resigned after it was revealed that he sold surgical masks for 249 SEK each.

Hahne is associated with a Swedish game development team called Nordic Empire Games, which in May 2022 released Acquitted, a computer game created in support of the actions of American citizen Kyle Rittenhouse during the Kenosha Unrest Shooting, with many far-right undertones present in the work.

References 

1992 births
21st-century Swedish politicians
Living people
Military personnel from Stockholm
Alternative for Sweden politicians
Sweden Democrats politicians
Politicians from Stockholm
Swedish nationalists